Posyan (also Romanized as Posyān; also known as Pīrmow’men) is a village in Khezerlu Rural District, in the Central District of Ajab Shir County, East Azerbaijan Province, Iran. At the 2006 census, its population was 556, in 131 families.

References 

Populated places in Ajab Shir County